Cymenshore is a place in Southern England where, according to the Anglo-Saxon Chronicle, Ælle of Sussex landed in AD 477 and battled the Britons with his three sons Cymen, Wlencing and Cissa, after the first of whom Cymenshore was held to have been named. Its location is unclear but was probably near Selsey.

Historical context

Foundation myths

The account of Ælle and his three sons landing at Cymenshore appears in the Anglo-Saxon Chronicle, a collection of seven vernacular manuscripts, commissioned in the 9th century, some 400 years or more after the events at Cymenshore. The legendary foundation of Saxon Sussex, by Ælle, is likely to have originated in an oral tradition before being recorded in the Anglo-Saxon Chronicle.{{efn|ASC 477 - Her cuom Ęlle on Bretenlond 7 his .iii. suna, Cymen 7 Wlencing 7 Cissa, mid .iii. scipum on þa stowe þe is nemned Cymenesora, 7 þær ofslogon monige Wealas 7 sume on fleame bedrifon on þone wudu þe is genemned Andredesleage.}} According to the Anglo-Saxon Chronicle Cymenshore is named after Cymen, one of Ælle's sons. 
From 491 until the arrival of Christianity in the 7th century, there was a dearth of contemporary written material.Because of the lack of written history before the 7th century it has made it difficult for historians to produce a definitive story. The preservation of Ælle's sons in Old English place names is unusual. The names of the founders, in other origin legends, seem to have British and/ or Latin roots not Old English. It is likely that the foundation stories were known before the 9th century, but the annalists manipulated them to provide a common origin for the new regime. These myths proport that the British were defeated and replaced by invading Anglo-Saxons arriving in small ships. These origin stories were largely believed right up to the 19th century.
Etymology
The Latin word ōra was used to indicate the edge of something such as a coast or sea-coast, (eg: ōra-maritima could be used to signify the inhabitants of a coastal region). Richard Coates has suggested that the Germanic invaders would previously have traded in the area and probably would have been familiar with the term and eventually use it by preference. Today the word  ōra is reflected in placenames where Jutish and West Saxon dialects were in operation (mainly in southern England).  It is possible that the stretch of low ground along the coast from Southampton to Bognor was called ōra "the shore", and that district names were used by the various coastal settlements. They include Ower near Southampton, Rowner near Gosport, Copnor in Portsmouth, Marker in West Thorney, Itchenor, Chalder Farm, Keynor Farm, Honer in Pagham and Bognor. Other place-name elements were derived from Latin too. With Latin elements such as vīcus, portūs and funta eventually being absorbed into Old English.
Jutish settlements

Towards the end of the Roman occupation of England, raids on the east coast became more intense and the expedient adopted by Romano-British leaders was to enlist the help of mercenaries to whom they ceded territory. It is thought that mercenaries may have started arriving in Sussex as early as the 5th century.  

J E A Jolliffe  compared agricultural and farming practices across 5th century Sussex to that of 5th century Kent. He suggested that the Kentish system underlaid the 5th century farming practices of Sussex. He hypothesised that Sussex was probably settled by Jutes before the arrival of the Saxons, with Jutish territory stretching from Kent to the New Forest. 

The Anglo Saxon Chronicle charted that Ælle and his forces, landed at Cymenshore and then travelled east and arrived at Beachy Head in 485, where they apparently broke through an agreed river border, the Mercreadesburne. The north Solent coast had been a trading area since Roman times. The old Roman roads between Sidlesham and Chichester and Chichester to Winchester would have provided access to the Jutish settlements in Hampshire. It is therefore more likely that the  German folk arriving in the 5th century would have been directed to the north of the ōra, and into Southampton Water. From there  into the mouth of the Meon valley and would have been allowed to settle near the existing Romano-British people.

Archaeological evidence
The archaeological evidence suggests that the main area of Anglo-Saxon settlement during the 5th century can be identified by the distribution of cemeteries of that period  Apart from Highdown, near Worthing and Apple Down, 11 km northwest of Chichester, they are between the lower Ouse and Cuckmere rivers in East Sussex. This area was believed to have been for the treaty settlement of Anglo-Saxon mercenaries And although some historians have suggested that Joliffe's findings 'strained the evidence' somewhat, analysis of grave goods have also provided evidence of Jutish settlement between  southern Hampshire and Chichester, in the early to mid-5th century. These connections had ceased by the end of that century.   

Location

Evidence for Selsey area

The Selsey area, is traditionally the most popular candidate for Cymenshore. The tradition is based largely on two charters that refer to a place with a similar name in the boundary clause to that cited in the Anglo-Saxon Chronicle.The charter that defined the land award to Wilfrid at Selsey, in the 7th century, by King Caedwalla is actually a 10th-century forgery. The relevant section of the forged charter, says (in Latin):

and the translation is:

A further source is from the Charter of Byrhthelm (presumably Brihthelm, bishop of Selsey), which is believed to be genuine and is to do with some land that had been seized from the See of Selsey, it confirms that the boundary is from Wytherings Mouth and Cymenshoran in the east to Hormouth in the west:

 

Rumbruge/ Rumbridge (alias "thri beorg" – three barrows, now the Medmerry Bank) is believed to have been an islet and trading port off the southwest coast of the Manhood Peninsula, that has long since succumbed to the sea and Wytherings mouth was part of what is now Pagham Harbour.

The Owers
Just off the tip of Selsey Bill, to approximately SSE, are groups of ledges and rocks known as the Owers. 

Outer and Middle Owers
Some historians such as Hunter-Blair identify the Outer Owers and Middle Owers as the landing place for Ælle.However this is problematical as according to SCOPAC the coastal erosion pattern means that this section of the Owers would not have been part of the shoreline for at least 5000 years.

The Mixon

To the south of Selsey Bill lies the Mixon rocks.

Selsey Bill was part of the Chichester Iron-Age . The centre was superseded by the Romano-British Belgic tribal civitas at Chichester. Evidence for Selsey’s past importance is provided by the many Atrebatean coins that have been discovered  along the Selsey shoreline over the years. The quantity of coins and the discovery of waste gold found have suggested that there was a  tribal mint at Selsey, the only other mint for this tribe was at Silchester. 

As the Mixon, south of Selsey Bill, would have been within the old oppidum's territory, W.A.R. Richardson speculates that it could be the site of Cidade Celha (the Old City) and therefore Cymensora. The archaeological evidence demonstrates that the Mixon would have been the shoreline during the Roman occupation, with it not being breached by the sea until the 10th or 11th century. As late as the 17th century, it was reported that the remains of the "ancient little city" could be seen at low tide.

Keynor
The Manor of Keynor is situated at the western end of Pagham Harbour. Selsey-based historians Edward Heron-Allen and Francis Mee favour the Keynor area of Sidlesham for Cymenshore; they suggest that the name Keynor is derived from Cymensora.
However Margaret Gelling asserts that Keyn-or actually means Cow-Shore in Old English.

Pagham Harbour
Pagham Harbour currently is a nature reserve, however in earlier times was a working harbour with three ports, one at the western end at Sidlesham Mill known as Wardur, one at the other at the entrance to the harbour and known as Charlton and one on the Pagham side known as the Port of Wythering (Wyderinges).
The port of Wardur was part of 'New Haven' a development in the Middle Ages. The Port of Wythering was overrun by the sea in the 13th century and the whole harbour eventually silted up and ceased to be navigable, except for small craft.

West Wittering
West Wittering has been cited by some early cartographers and historians as the site for Cymenshore. For example in his Britannia Camden said:
 
Also Morden's map of 1695 shows Cimenshore  being adjacent to the Witterings.  

However, other historians have posited that siting Cymenshore off West Wittering as mistaken and was probably due to a mistranslation of the charter. The charter itself, in the original early English describes part of the boundary of the land as .. Wedering muðe.. (Wedering mouth). Wedering was the port of Withering a village, now lost, at the entrance to what is now Pagham Harbour. It is possible that earlier historians had translated Wedering incorrectly, as Wittering.

Other possible locations

Ouse-Cuckmere
Welch believes that the location for Cymenshore is more likely to be in the Ouse-Cuckmere area of East Sussex, his reasoning is that there is no archaeological evidence to support a landing at Selsey. However Richardson states that the place names with the Old English ora element of Cymensora are very common along the Hampshire and West Sussex coastline but not around the Ouse-Cuckmere area. There is also a suggestion that the archaeology off the Selsey coast has just not been fully realised yet.

Shoreham

Shoreham has also been cited as a possible location, for example in 1906 Hilaire Belloc in his Hills and the Sea'' when discussing St Wilfrid he said:

See also
 History of Sussex

Notes

Citations

References

External links
Alternate etymology for Cymenshorea. This author (not peer reviewed) suggests that Cymenshore was named after Commius(name in Old Welsh=Cymynu), several hundred years before Ælle.
Sidlesham Parish Site - Information on how to find Keynor - Note Keynor Lane on map and Earnley (suggested area for Rumbruge) immediately to the west.
 St Thomas a Becket - Parish Church at the East end of Pagham Harbour near to Wythering. St Wilfrid gave Pagham to the Archbishops of Canterbury when he left Selsey, and they are still the patrons of this church. A Saxon burial urn was found near to the church in the 1950s and now is on display in the south aisle.
 Movable Type Scripts - Useful site for calculating distances based on the latitude/ longitude bearings. It will also provide a map of the locations. You can use this to calculate the distances between Selsey Bill and the various Owers rocks.
 Online translation of the 1607 edition of Camden's Britannia- See section 4. of the Sussex pages for description of Selsey.

History of West Sussex
Anglo-Saxon sites in England
Anglo-Saxon settlements
History of Sussex